Paul Strisik (April 22, 1918 – July 22, 1998) was an American plein air painter.

Background 
Strisik was born in Brooklyn, New York City. From 1937 – 1940 he owned and operated The Hall Fish and Line Co. in New York State, before enlisting in the US. Navy in 1941. He was then stationed in French Morocco as Chief Photographers Mate. He moved to Rockport, Massachusetts in the 1950s. He then attended the Art Students League of New York where he was taught by Frank DuMond.

Strisik painted in both oil and watercolor, and was an en plein air (painting outdoors) painter. While primarily a New England artist, he also painted European subjects, and between 1976 and 1992, he lived and painted part time in Santa Fe, New Mexico.

During his life, Strisik was a member of the Rockport Art Association and North Shore Art Association, and an academician with the National Academy of Design. He also wrote several books on painting, including The Art of Landscape Painting and Capturing Light in Oils.

References

The Life and Art of Paul Strisik, N.A.  by Judith A. Curtis
The Art of Landscape Painting by Paul Strisik published by Watson-Guptill
Capturing Light in Oils by Paul Strisik published by Northlight, 1995

External links
Paul Strisik site
Paul Strisik retrospective at the Rockport Art Association
Paul Strisik art at the Wiscasset Bay Gallery
Artwork by Paul Strisik

1918 births
1998 deaths
Art Students League of New York alumni
20th-century American painters
American male painters
20th-century American male artists